Edward Langton Iliffe, 2nd Baron Iliffe (25 January 1908 – 15 February 1996), generally known as Langton Iliffe, was a British peer. He was the son of The 1st Baron Iliffe and his wife, Charlotte, daughter of Henry Gilding.

Iliffe married Renée Merandon du Plessis, a Mauritian of French descent, on 8 December 1938. His best man at the wedding was the architect, Winton Aldridge.

Iliffe succeeded his father, as The 2nd Baron Iliffe, in 1960. As the Iliffe's marriage was childless, on Langton Iliffe's death, in 1996, the title passed to his nephew, Robert Peter Richard Iliffe, 3rd Baron Iliffe (b. 1944).

During World War II, Iliffe served as an RAF intelligence officer. After the cessation of hostilities, he returned to the family business. The family owned the controlling interests in newspapers in Birmingham and Coventry, including the Birmingham Post, the Birmingham Mail and the Coventry Evening Telegraph. The Iliffes were also part owners of the British national newspaper, the Daily Telegraph. In 1957, Iliffe served as The High Sheriff of Berkshire.

Lord Iliffe and his wife dedicated their lives to the restoration of Basildon Park, a Palladian mansion, with views over the Thames Valley near Reading in Berkshire, which they had purchased in 1953. Over the following 25 years the couple fully restored the interior and exterior of the derelict mansion. Lord Iliffe was a cultivated man, deeply interested in the arts and architecture. In the restoration of Basildon park, he and his wife drew their inspiration from a wide circle of friends, which included Winton Aldridge, Ronald Tree and Graham Sutherland. On the completion of the restoration, Iliffe presented the house with a large endowment, for its future upkeep, to the National Trust

Following the donation of Basildon Park to the National Trust, Lord and Lady Iliffe remained as tenants, eventually converting the mansion's former laundry wing into a self-contained house. Lord Iliffe died on 15 February 1996, his wife died, at Basildon, aged 90, in 2007.

See also 
 Yattendon Group

Notes

References 

Obituary of Renee, Lady Iliffe Published in the Daily Telegraph 15 Sep 2007. Accessed 1 July 2010.

1908 births
1996 deaths
Barons in the Peerage of the United Kingdom
People from Basildon, Berkshire
English philanthropists
High Sheriffs of Berkshire
20th-century British newspaper publishers (people)
Iliffe family
20th-century British philanthropists